Autochloris simulans is a moth of the subfamily Arctiinae. It was described by Herbert Druce in 1909. It is found in French Guiana.

References

Arctiinae
Moths described in 1909
Moths of South America